Courage Pekuson (born 2 January 1995) is a Ghanaian professional footballer who play as an attacking midfielder for  club Safa.

Club career

Sohar SC
Pekuson joined Sohar on loan from Al-Nasr in the 2014–2015 season.

Koper
Pekuson signed for Slovenian PrvaLiga side Koper in August 2016. He made his professional debut for the club on 20 August against NK Radomlje. He came on as a 61st-minute substitute for Joel Valencia as Koper won 3–0. Pekuson scored his first goal for the club on 22 October against NK Domžale. His 2nd-minute goal gave Koper the lead but the club still ended the match losing 3–1. In March 2017, Pekuson received Player of the Week honours for the Slovenian PrvaLiga after he scored a brace 11 March 2017 against NK Radomlje.

Kerala Blasters
On 10 August 2017 it was announced that Pekuson had signed with the Blasters of the Indian Super League. He made his debut on 17 November 2017 in a home game against ATK which ended in a tie, 0-0. He scored his first goal in a 1–3 loss to Bengaluru FC. Pekuson continued his stint with the Blasters FC in the 2018–19 season.

Safa
In July 2022, Pekuson joined Lebanese Premier League side Safa.

International career
Pekuson represented the Ghana U23 side.

Career statistics

References

1995 births
Living people
Ghanaian footballers
Association football midfielders
Al-Nasr SC (Dubai) players
Sohar SC players
FC Koper players
Kerala Blasters FC players
Safa SC players
Slovenian PrvaLiga players
Indian Super League players

Ghanaian expatriate footballers
Ghanaian expatriate sportspeople in Slovenia
Ghanaian expatriate sportspeople in India
Ghanaian expatriate sportspeople in Lebanon
Expatriate footballers in Slovenia
Expatriate footballers in India
Expatriate footballers in Lebanon